Chai Lee is an actress, born in Canton, China.

She is best known for her appearances in British films and television, particularly her uncredited role as a Moonbase Alpha operative in the science fiction series Space 1999, as Esther in The Professionals and her performance in the crime drama Gangsters, as Lily Li Tang.

Her other TV appearances include The Benny Hill Show, Angels and Ripping Yarns.

Her film credits include Yellow Emanuelle, Queen Kong and The Great Muppet Caper. Lee also makes an appearance in the 1981 James Bond film For Your Eyes Only.

References

External links 

Year of birth missing (living people)
Living people
British film actresses
British television actresses
Chinese film actresses
Chinese television actresses
20th-century Chinese actresses
20th-century British actresses